Altoga is an unincorporated community in Collin County, in the U.S. state of Texas.

History
Altoga had a post office from 1889 until the 1930s. The name is derived from "all together", a favorite saying of the founder.

References

Unincorporated communities in Collin County, Texas
Unincorporated communities in Texas